"Sweet Lorraine" is a song by the band Uriah Heep, first released on the 1972 album The Magician's Birthday on Bronze Records, the first single from that album. It was written by Mick Box, Gary Thain and David Byron and reached #91 in the US Billboard Hot 100. The B-side is "Blind Eye".

One of the band's better-known songs, it is famous, in part, for its Moog synthesizer solo performed by Ken Hensley. It became popular in live performance.

Personnel
David Byron – vocals
Ken Hensley – Moog synthesizer
Mick Box – guitar
Lee Kerslake – drums
Gary Thain – bass guitar

Charts

References

Uriah Heep (band) songs
1972 singles
Songs written by David Byron
Songs written by Gary Thain
Songs written by Mick Box